Karakkodan Puzha (കാരക്കോടന്‍ പുഴ) is a small river joining with Maruthappuzha which is a sub-tributary of Chaliyar, in Malappuram district. The river originates from the foothills of Nadukani forests near Gudalur. It pass through Vazhikkadavu panchayath  and joins with Maruthappuzha near Munda.

Rivers of Malappuram district